Oleksandr Valeriyovych Medvedyev (born 7 July 1994) is a Ukrainian professional footballer who plays as a centre-back.

References

External links
 
 
 

1994 births
Living people
Footballers from Kramatorsk
Ukrainian footballers
Association football defenders
FC Illichivets-2 Mariupol players
FC Mariupol players
FC Barsa Sumy players
PFC Sumy players
FC Inhulets Petrove players
FC Inhulets-2 Petrove players
FC Alians Lypova Dolyna players
FC Kramatorsk players
Ukrainian First League players
Ukrainian Second League players
Ukrainian Amateur Football Championship players